Coming Through Slaughter is a novel by Michael Ondaatje, published by House of Anansi in 1976. It was the winner of the 1976 Books in Canada First Novel Award.

The novel is a fictionalized version of the life of the New Orleans jazz pioneer Buddy Bolden. It covers the last months of Bolden's sanity in 1907, as his music becomes more radical and his behavior more erratic. A secondary character in the story is the photographer E. J. Bellocq. Both these historical figures are portrayed in ways that draw on their actual lives, but which depart from the facts in order to explore the novel's central theme – the relationship between creativity and self-destruction.

The novel draws on the style of jazz, being structured in a fragmented, and "syncopated" form, with episodes extending in elongated "riffs" before suddenly lurching unpredictably into an apparently unrelated scene. The structure also conveys Bolden's own wild, fragmenting personality, as his schizophrenia takes hold. Bolden's manic, extroverted but self-harming behavior is set against the introverted figure of Bellocq, who expresses his own frustrated desires in his intimate erotic photographs, but then compulsively violates them with scratches.

In 2006, Variety reported that Ben Ross was adapting Coming Through Slaughter for the screen.

References

1976 Canadian novels
Novels by Michael Ondaatje
Canadian historical novels
Fiction set in 1907
Novels set in New Orleans
Jazz books
Novels about music
House of Anansi Press books
1976 debut novels